Randolph Sinks Foster (February 22, 1820 – May 1, 1903) was an American bishop of the Methodist Episcopal Church, elected in 1872.

Biography
Born on February 22, 1820, at Williamsburg, Ohio, U.S., the son of Israel Foster and Mary "Polly" Kain,
he attended Augusta College in Kentucky, but left to become a Preacher in the Ohio Conference of the Methodist Episcopal Church when he was only seventeen.  He was ordained to the Traveling Ministry by Bishops Waugh and Hedding.  He went on to become the pastor of the Mulberry Street M.E. Church in New York City, where he met Daniel Drew, the financier who provided the original funding for the Drew Theological Seminary in Madison, New Jersey.

Prior to his election to the episcopacy, Foster served in pastoral appointments and in educational work.  He was president of Northwestern University, Evanston, Illinois, 1857–1860.  He also accepted John McClintock's invitation to become Professor of Systematic Theology at Drew.  After the death of Drew's first President in 1870, Foster was elected to that post, remaining there until becoming a bishop in 1872, when he was assigned to the Cincinnati, Ohio area.

He died at Newton Centre, Massachusetts on May 1, 1903.  He was buried in Green-Wood Cemetery, Brooklyn, New York.

Works
Foster wrote the book Objections to Calvinism as it is: in a series of letters addressed to N.L. Rice in 1849.  Also "Christian Purity or the Heritage of Faith" in 1872

See also
List of bishops of the United Methodist Church

References

Methodism:  Ohio Area (1812–1962), edited by John M. Ver Steeg, Litt.D., D.D. (Ohio Area Sesquicentennial Committee, 1962).

External links

 
Timeline 1850-1899, History, About, Northwestern University at www.northwestern.edu
Biographical Notes: Presidents and Key Figures -- University Library -- Drew University at depts.drew.edu

1820 births
1903 deaths
American Methodist Episcopal bishops
American religion academics
American theologians
Arminian ministers
Arminian theologians
Bishops of the Methodist Episcopal Church
Presidents of Northwestern University
Burials at Green-Wood Cemetery
People from Clermont County, Ohio
19th-century Methodist bishops
Religious leaders from Cincinnati
Drew University faculty
Presidents of Drew University
19th-century American clergy